Hotel Nevai is a four-star hotel situated in the Verbier ski resort in Canton Valais, Switzerland. It was established in December 2007, replacing the Hotel Rhodania, and is a member of Design Hotels.

Facilities 
Hotel Nevai's facilities include a spa called Elemis, a sushi restaurant, and a nightclub called the Farm Club. The hotel has 33 rooms and 2 penthouse apartments.

Farm Club 
The hotel's nightclub, called the "Farm Club", was opened in 1971 by two Italian brothers, the Berardis. It is one of the oldest clubs in the Alps and to this day maintains a seventies theme.

Style 
Hotel Nevai was renovated in 2007 by Yasmine Mahmoudieh from Architonic. The retrofit aimed to reflect the surrounding mountains while avoiding the tropes of typical alpine styles.

References

External links 
  Hotel Nevai website
 https://www.telegraph.co.uk/travel/destinations/europe/switzerland/verbier/articles/a-weekend-break-inverbier/
 https://www.designhotels.com/hotels/switzerland/verbier/hotel-nevai
 https://www.telegraph.co.uk/travel/759586/Verbier-coming-in-from-the-cold.html
 http://www.vogue.com/13435220/swiss-alps-switzerland-summer-travel-guide/

Hotels in Switzerland
Buildings and structures in Valais